Nance is an unincorporated community in Charles City County, Virginia, United States.

References
GNIS reference

Unincorporated communities in Virginia
Unincorporated communities in Charles City County, Virginia